A special election was held in  to fill a vacancy caused by John Bailey (DR) being declared not eligible for the seat which he'd won the previous year on March 24, 1824.  The election was held on August 30, 1824, with additional ballots held on November 1 and November 29 due to a majority not being achieved on the first or second ballot.

Election results

Bailey was seated again December 13, 1824.

See also
List of special elections to the United States House of Representatives
 1824 and 1825 United States House of Representatives elections

References

Massachusetts 1824 10
Massachusetts 1824 10
1824 10
Massachusetts 10
United States House of Representatives 10
United States House of Representatives 1824 10